The 2017 Big South women's basketball tournament was a postseason women's basketball tournament for the Big South Conference that took place March 9–12, 2017, at the Vines Center in Lynchburg, Virginia. All rounds after 1st were broadcast on ESPN3, 1st Round on Big South Network. UNC Asheville won their 3rd Big South tournament title and earns an automatic big to the NCAA women's tournament.

Format
All 10 teams were eligible for the tournament.

Seeds

Schedule

*Game times in Eastern Time. #Rankings denote tournament seeding.

Bracket

See also
 2017 Big South Conference men's basketball tournament

References

Big South
Big South Conference women's basketball tournament